Larisa Neiland and Brenda Schultz-McCarthy won in the final 6–4, 7–6 (9–7) against Kristie Boogert and Helena Suková.

Seeds
Champion seeds are indicated in bold text while text in italics indicates the round in which those seeds were eliminated.

 Larisa Neiland /  Brenda Schultz-McCarthy (champions)
 Kristie Boogert /  Helena Suková (final)
 Alexia Dechaume-Balleret /  Sandrine Testud (semifinals)
 Els Callens /  Laurence Courtois (semifinals)

Draw

References
 1996 Wilkinson Championships Doubles Draw

Women's Doubles
Doubles